Port Talbot Lifeboat Station (based in, Aberavon, Port Talbot, Neath Port Talbot, Wales) was opened in 1966 as an Inshore Lifeboat Station with a  lifeboat. The station is currently housed in a purpose built building close to the coastguard and lifeguard station that was finished in 1998.

The station currently operates the  lifeboat Nigel Martin Spender (D-713).

The lifeboat station works and trains closely with Port Talbot Coastguard, RNLI Lifeguards and RAF Search & Rescue.

Fleet

Station Honours

Thanks of the Institution Inscribed on Vellum - 1995
The Thanks of the Institution Inscribed on Vellum was awarded to Robert Vernon Harris for his courage and initiative when he transferred from the lifeboat to another vessel.

Framed Letter of Thanks x 2 - 1995
Framed Letters of Thanks were awarded to Crew Members Leigh Worth and Stanley May for their assistance during a transfer from the lifeboat to another vessel.

Framed Letter of Thanks x 2 - 1999
Framed Letters of Thanks were presented to Helmsman Matthew Rossi, Crew Member Leon Murphy and Crew Member David Jones assisting the ship Mineral Century.

Thanks of the Institution Inscribed on Vellum x 2- 2006
Thanks of the Institution inscribed on Vellum were awarded to Helmsman David Jones and Crew Member Christopher Thomas for saving the life of a man who was thrown overboard from a motorboat during strong winds and 3m high seas.

Framed Letter of Thanks - 2006
A Framed Letter of Thanks was presented to Crew Member Rachel Thomas for saving the life of a man who was thrown overboard from a motorboat during strong winds and 3m high seas.

References

External links
Port Talbot lifeboat station homepage
Port Talbot Coastguard

Lifeboat stations in Wales
Transport infrastructure completed in 1966
Port Talbot